is a 2010 tower defense video game by Ancient for the Xbox 360. Released on the Xbox Live Indie Games service, the game features music composed by Ancient co-founder Yuzo Koshiro.

Players assume the roles of four character classes (Fighter, Ninja, Amazon and Mage) tasked with the duty of protecting a princess from legions of oncoming monster hordes. Protect Me Knight features 8-bit visuals and audio and contains different digital box art styles for the Japanese and English versions of the game, as a humorous spoof to the regional box art differences of video games from the 8-bit and 16-bit eras.

A sequel, Gotta Protectors, was released for the Nintendo 3DS in Japan in September 2014 and globally in July 2016. A third game, Gotta Protectors: Cart of Darkness, was released for the Nintendo Switch in Japan in October 2019 and in English by 8-4 in April 2022.

References

External links
Protect Me Knight official website
Gotta Protectors: Cart of Darkness official website

2010 video games
Action video games
Ancient (company) games
Cooperative video games
Fantasy video games
Hack and slash games
Indie video games
Multiplayer and single-player video games
Retro-style video games
Tower defense video games
Video games about ninja
Video games developed in Japan
Video games featuring female protagonists
Video games scored by Yuzo Koshiro
Xbox 360 games
Xbox 360 Live Indie games
Xbox 360-only games